Miroslav Durak (born June 9, 1981) is a Slovak former professional ice hockey player.

Durak was drafted 220th overall by the Nashville Predators in the 1999 NHL Entry Draft. After his draft selection, he began to play junior in North America, beginning with the Des Moines Buccaneers in the United States Hockey League. He then moved to the Quebec Major Junior Hockey League where he played for the Sherbrooke Castors and the Acadie-Bathurst Titan. He then signed for the Predators organization in 2002, but spent the majority of his time in the ECHL for the Toledo Storm as well as one game in the American Hockey League for the Milwaukee Admirals. He departed after just one season in the organization and moved to the Czech Extraliga before moving back to his native Slovakia. He also had spells in France, Poland and Hungary.

References

External links

1981 births
Acadie–Bathurst Titan players
Des Moines Buccaneers players
Dragons de Rouen players
HK Dukla Michalovce players
Dunaújvárosi Acélbikák players
GKS Tychy (ice hockey) players
HC Oceláři Třinec players
HC Slovan Bratislava players
PSG Berani Zlín players
HK 36 Skalica players
HK Nitra players
IHC Písek players
Living people
Milwaukee Admirals players
Motor České Budějovice players
MsHK Žilina players
Nashville Predators draft picks
Sherbrooke Castors players
Slovak ice hockey defencemen
Toledo Storm players
Újpesti TE (ice hockey) players
Sportspeople from Nitra
Slovak expatriate ice hockey players in Canada
Slovak expatriate ice hockey players in the Czech Republic
Czech expatriate ice hockey players in the United States
Czech expatriate sportspeople in France
Czech expatriate sportspeople in Hungary
Czech expatriate sportspeople in Poland
Expatriate ice hockey players in France
Expatriate ice hockey players in Poland
Expatriate ice hockey players in Hungary